was the eleventh of the fifty-three stations of the Tōkaidō during Edo period Japan. It is located in the present-day city of Mishima, in Shizuoka Prefecture.

History
In Mishima-juku, there were two honjin and 74 other minor inns for travelers. Mishima was the only post station located within Izu Province. Mishima was the traditional provincial capital of Izu from the Nara period and the location of a major Shinto shrine. Until 1759, Mishima was the location of the daikanshō, the seat of government for the hatamoto-class retainer appointed by the Tokugawa shogunate to rule over Izu Province.

Additionally, because water flows from Mount Fuji to the town, it was referred to as the "Capital of Water."

The classic ukiyo-e print by Andō Hiroshige (Hōeidō edition) from 1831–1834 depicts travelers setting out in the early morning mists. One is mounted, and the other is traveling by kago. The torii of Mishima Taisha shrine is in the background. By contrast, the Kyōka edition of the late 1830s depicts a snow-covered village, with Mount Fuji in the background.

Neighboring post towns
Tōkaidō
Hakone-juku - Mishima-shuku - Numazu-juku

Further reading
Carey, Patrick. Rediscovering the Old Tokaido:In the Footsteps of Hiroshige. Global Books UK (2000). 
Chiba, Reiko. Hiroshige's Tokaido in Prints and Poetry. Tuttle. (1982) 
Taganau, Jilly. The Tokaido Road: Travelling and Representation in Edo and Meiji Japan. RoutledgeCurzon (2004).

References

Stations of the Tōkaidō
Stations of the Tōkaidō in Shizuoka Prefecture